The Veliisa Stele is a fragment of a Luwian hieroglyphic inscription of Neo-Hittite date. It is on display in the Niğde Archaeological Museum, where its inventory number is 53.

Description 
The grey basalt stone has a vaguely triangular cross-section. From the two surfaces on the reverse of the stone and vertical centre line between them it is believed that slightly more than half of the original stele has survived. The surviving stone represents the bottom part of the original stele. The fragment has a height of 43 cm and a width of 44 cm. The maximum depth is 20 cm. On the upper half of the well-preserved front face, deeply cut hieroglyphic letters can be read.

Hawkins gives the translation of the text as follows: 

Based on the shape and the style of the script, Hawkins placed the document in the late 8th century BC. The findspot places the stele within the Iron Age Luwian kingdom of Tuwana.

Discovery & Publication 
The exact find situation of the fragment is not known. The German archaeologist Helmuth Theodor Bossert published the first translation of the inscription in 1954. Another edition was produced by Piero Meriggi in 1975. The Hittitologist  produced a new translation in 2000 for his Corpus of Hieroglyphic Luwian Inscriptions.

References

Bibliography 
 Dietrich Berges, Johannes Nollé. Tyana - Archäologisch-historische Untersuchungen zum südwestlichen Kappadokien. Habelt, Bonn 2000,  pp. 106.
 John David Hawkins. Corpus of Hieroglyphic Luwian Inscriptions. Vol. I: Inscriptions of the Iron Age. Part 2: Text. Amuq, Aleppo, Hama, Tabal, Assur Letters, Miscellaneous, Seals, Indices. (= Studies in Indo-European Language and Culture 8). de Gruyter, Berlin. 2000, . p. 529 No. X.49 Tab. 303.

External links 
 hittitemonuments.com

8th-century BC steles
1954 archaeological discoveries
Archaeological discoveries in Turkey
Luwian inscriptions
History of Niğde Province